Events from the year 1899 in Denmark.

Incumbents
 Monarch – Christian IX
 Prime minister – Hugo Egmont Hørring

Events
 18 May  The Odsherred Railway opens.
 21 July  The Danish Nurses' Organization is established.
 22 November  J. P. Suhr & Søn is dissolved.

Undated
 The Women's Council in Denmark us established.

Culture

Art
 March  The annual Charlottenborg Spring Exhibition opems. Anna Ancher's A Vaccination has already prior to the opening of the exhibition been sold to a Swedish collector, a fact reported in several newspapers.

Sports
 4 June  KFUMs Boldklub København is founded.

Births
 2 March – Harald Agersnap, composer, educator and musician (died 1982)
 10 March – Finn Høffding, composer (died 1997)
 11 March – Frederick IX, King of Denmark (died 1972)
 19 March – Aksel Sandemose, author (died 1965)
 27 July – Carl Johan Hviid, actor (died 1964)

Deaths
 17 August – Erik Bøgh, journalist, playwright and songwriter (born 1822)
 21 October – Edvard Jünger, precision mechanic (born 1823) 
 18 November – Hans Peter Hansen, xylographer (born 1829)
 29 December  Vilhelm Christesen, silver smith (born 1822)

References

Rxternal links

 
1890s in Denmark
Denmark
Years of the 19th century in Denmark